Edward H. Whitney was an American tennis player active in the early 20th century.

Tennis career
Whitney was interscholastic champion. He reached the semifinals of the U.S. National Championships in 1910 and the quarterfinals in 1909.  He also won the NCAA Men's Tennis Championship in 1911 while competing for Harvard University.

Grand Slam tournament performance timeline

References

American male tennis players
Year of death missing
1891 births
Harvard Crimson men's tennis players
Tennis players from Boston